Faversham Almshouses are Grade II listed  Almshouses in Faversham, Kent.

History

Almshouses for six widows were founded and endowed by Thomas Mendfield in 1614.

In 1721 Thomas Napleton founded and endowed houses for six men.

In 1840, Henry Wreight, local solicitor and former Mayor of Faversham, gave a bequest which enabled the rebuilding of the almshouses on a grand scale. The architects were Hooker and Wheeler of Brenchley, Kent and the rebuilding was complete by 1863. The builder was G W Chinnock Bros of Southampton.

The accommodation was modernised in 1982 at a cost of £ (about £ as of ).

List of chaplains

J. H. Talbot 1867–1870
William Francis Hobson 1870–1881
Henry Eldridge Curtis 1881–????
Joseph Henry Miles 1922–1930
Canon Tony Oehring

References

Almshouses in Kent
Residential buildings completed in 1863
Grade II listed almshouses
Grade II listed buildings in Kent
Buildings and structures in Faversham